Mohammad Salimi (1937 – 2016) was an Iranian military who served as the 6th Minister of Defense in November 1981 to August 1984 and the commander of the Islamic Republic of Iran Army in 2000 to 2005.

Early life
Salimi was born in Mashhad in 1937.

Career
Salimi was the defense minister in the cabinet of Mir-Hossein Mousavi, replacing Javad Fakoori. He was in office from 1981 to August 1984. He was succeeded by Mohammad Hossein Jalali as defense minister.

Although Salimi retired, he was appointed commander-in-chief in May 2000, replacing Ali Shahbazi. Salimi resigned from office in September 2005. He was succeeded by Major General Ataollah Salehi as the commander-in-chief of the Iranian Army. Then Salimi was named as Ali Khamenei's military advisor on the same date.

See also 
 List of Iranian two-star generals since 1979

References

External links

1937 births
2016 deaths
Defence ministers of Iran
Islamic Republic of Iran Army major generals
Commander-in-Chiefs of Islamic Republic of Iran Army
Islamic Republic of Iran Army personnel of the Iran–Iraq War
People from Mashhad